Teo Usuelli ( 13 December 1920 – 13 April 2009) was an Italian composer.

Born in Reggio Emilia in 1920, he studied music at the Giuseppe Verdi Conservatory in Milan, where he was graduated in choral music and composition. During the Second World War, he had fought with the Italian partisans, then he moved to Rome, where he began his career as composer.

He is probably best known for the main theme of the 1972 giallo film Amuck!, "Piacere Sequence", that was later used in The Big Lebowski, in the TV-series Spaced and in the documentary film How to Draw a Bunny.
He frequently worked with director Marco Ferreri on films such as The Conjugal Bed (1963), The Ape Woman (1964), Controsesso (1964), The Man, the Woman and the Money (1965), The Man with the Balloons (1965), Dillinger Is Dead (1969), The Seed of Man (1969), and L'udienza (1972).

His other film scores include I grandi condottieri (1965), Agente S 03: Operazione Atlantide (1965), The Seventh Floor (1967), Strogoff (1970), Il prato macchiato di rosso (1973), and Il solco di pesca (1976).

References

External links 
 
 Teo Usuelli at Discogs

1920 births
Italian film score composers
Italian male film score composers
People from Reggio Emilia
2009 deaths
Milan Conservatory alumni
Italian resistance movement members
20th-century Italian musicians
20th-century Italian male musicians